Santa Giustina in Colle is a comune (municipality) in the Province of Padua in the Italian region Veneto, located about  northwest of Venice and about  north of Padua.  
Santa Giustina in Colle borders the following municipalities: Campo San Martino, Camposampiero, Castelfranco Veneto, Loreggia, San Giorgio delle Pertiche, San Martino di Lupari, Villa del Conte.

References

Cities and towns in Veneto